is a Japanese triathlete. She competed in the Women's event at the 2012 Summer Olympics.

References

1983 births
Living people
Japanese female triathletes
Olympic triathletes of Japan
Triathletes at the 2012 Summer Olympics
People from Hirakata
Triathletes at the 2010 Asian Games
Asian Games medalists in triathlon
Asian Games gold medalists for Japan
Medalists at the 2010 Asian Games
20th-century Japanese women
21st-century Japanese women